Akkermansia muciniphila is a human intestinal symbiont, isolated from human feces. It is a mucin-degrading bacterium belonging to the genus, Akkermansia, discovered in 2004 by Muriel Derrien and Willem de Vos at Wageningen University of the Netherlands.  It belongs to the phylum Verrucomicrobiota and its type strain is MucT (=ATCC BAA-835T =CIP 107961T). It is under preliminary research for its potential association with metabolic disorders.

Morphology
A. muciniphila is a gram-negative, strictly anaerobic, non-motile, non-spore-forming, oval-shaped bacterium.

Ecology and metabolism 
It colonizes the gastrointestinal tract of humans and other animals and can be found within the intestinal mucosal layer of the epithelial crypts as well as in the caecum. It specifically resides at the oxic-anoxic interface. A. muciniphila is found in about 90% of healthy humans, makes up about 1% to 3% of the fecal microbiota and colonizes the gut during the first year of life. Its prevalence can decrease with age or in disease states.

A. muciniphila is able to use mucin as its sole source of carbon, nitrogen and energy, and is hence considered a specialist. It degrades mucin to produce beneficial products such as short chain fatty acids which aid in growth of other bacteria and maintain healthy mucus turnover. It also maintains microbial balance by competing with and inhibiting the over-growth of other mucin degrading bacteria. A. muciniphila is culturable under anaerobic conditions on medium containing porcine gastric mucin or synthetic medium containing protein source with glucose, N-acetylglucosamine and N-acetylgalactosamine.

Genomics
The circular chromosome of the type strain contains 2,664,102 base pairs and its proteome contains 5644 unique proteins.

A. muciniphila strain Urmite was sequenced in its entirety from a human feces sample.

Human consumption
Oral Akkermansia muciniphila, either live or pasteurized, "are safe and well tolerated in overweight and obese individuals." However, its safety for use as a treatment during disease states is unestablished.

The European Union has recognized pasteurized Akkermansia muciniphila MucT as a novel food, provided the cells are killed beyond the limit of detection.

References

Further reading

External links

Type strain of Akkermansia muciniphila at BacDive -  the Bacterial Diversity Metadatabase

Verrucomicrobiota
Bacteria described in 2004
Gram-negative bacteria